Cavernicola, cave-dwelling in Latin, may refer to:

Music
 Cavernicola CD, a CD by the band Los Peyotes
 Cavernivola Records, a label by the band Che Sudaka
 Tatán Cavernícola, a member of Chilean band Pánico

Biology
 Cavernicola (bug), a genus of assassin bugs in the family Reduviidae
 Cavernicola (worm), a cave-dwelling suborder of tricladid flatworms

Taxonomy disambiguation pages